Robbin Sellin (born 12 April 1990) is a Swedish former footballer who played as a midfielder.

Career
Sellin started playing football at the age of four when he joined his hometown club BKV Norrtälje. After having also spent some time as a youth player at Allsvenskan club Djurgårdens IF he was signed to a first team contract by third-tier side IK Brage in 2009. Two and a half years later, in the middle of the 2012 season, he had impressed enough to make the move up to Allsvenskan when he was signed by GIF Sundsvall.

International career
Sellin has represented both the Sweden national under-17 football team and Sweden national under-19 football team on several occasions.

Personal life
Sellin grew up supporting Djurgårdens IF. Until the age of 15 he combined playing football with Ice hockey before choosing the former as his career.

References

External links

 
 

1990 births
Living people
Swedish footballers
Swedish expatriate footballers
Association football midfielders
Djurgårdens IF Fotboll players
IK Brage players
GIF Sundsvall players
IFK Mariehamn players
Superettan players
Allsvenskan players
Veikkausliiga players
Sweden youth international footballers
Swedish expatriate sportspeople in Finland
Expatriate footballers in Finland